Jaylon Moore (born July 1, 1997) is an American football wide receiver for the Jacksonville Jaguars of the National Football League (NFL). He played college football at UT Martin and was signed by the Baltimore Ravens as an undrafted free agent in 2020.

College career 
Moore played college football at UT Martin. In his UT Martin career he had 92 receptions for a total of 1492 receiving yards and 18 receiving touchdowns.

Professional career

Baltimore Ravens

2020 
Moore went undrafted during the 2020 NFL Draft. On April 26, 2020, Moore signed with the Baltimore Ravens as an undrafted free agent. When Moore was signed by the Baltimore Ravens he became the only UT Martin player signed by an NFL team for the season. On September 5, 2020, Moore was released by the Baltimore Ravens, and on the next day Moore was signed by the Baltimore Ravens practice squad. Moore was never re-elevated to the 53-man active roster and remained on the practice squad the rest of the season.

2021 
On January 18, 2021, Moore signed a reserves/future deal with the Baltimore Ravens. On May 17, 2021, it was confirmed that Jaylon Moore would be switching from No. 81 to No. 10. Moore made his preseason debut on August 14, 2021 against the New Orleans Saints. He finished as the Ravens leading receiver with two catches for 32 yards. On August 31, 2021, Moore was released by the Ravens. He was subsequently signed to the practice squad a day later. He signed a reserve/future contract with the Ravens on January 10, 2022. He was waived on August 23, 2022.

New York Giants
On August 24, 2022, Moore was claimed off waivers by the New York Giants. He was waived on August 30, 2022 and signed to the practice squad the next day. On September 1, 2022, the Giants waived Moore.

Jacksonville Jaguars
On September 4, 2022, Moore was signed to the Jacksonville Jaguars practice squad. He signed a reserve/future contract on January 23, 2023.

References

External links 
UT Martin bio
Jaylon Moore Stats - Pro-Football-Reference.com
Jaylon Moore - Baltimore Ravens
Jaylon Moore, WR, Baltimore Ravens, NFL - CBSSports.com
Meet 2020 NFL Draft Prospect: Jaylon Moore, WR, UT-Martin

1997 births
Living people
Players of American football from Memphis, Tennessee
American football wide receivers
UT Martin Skyhawks football players
Baltimore Ravens players
New York Giants players
Jacksonville Jaguars players